Herman Heinrich Spitz (born March 2, 1925) is an American psychologist known for his work measuring intelligence among those with developmental disability. He was director of research at the E.R. Johnstone Training and Research Center, which was a state institution for adolescents and young adults with upper-level intellectual disability in Bordentown, New Jersey, until he retired in 1989. He worked under the direction of the Superintendent John M. Wall, who retired in 1990 having served from August 1969.

Spitz studied concepts such as mental age, and the abilities of autistic savants. He co-authored a survey of attempts to raise intelligence among people with intellectual disability. He reported on programs like the Carolina Abecedarian Early Intervention Project which advocated the early education of poor children. Through use of the Wechsler Adult Intelligence Scale, he reported that the Flynn effect of massive intelligence quotient gains in a single generation in many nations only applied to people in the average intelligence range. He also looked at the hereditarian hypothesis for general intelligence factor by examining Wechsler subtest patterns among test-takers with intellectual disability.

In 1994 he was one of 52 signatories on "Mainstream Science on Intelligence," an editorial written by Linda Gottfredson and published in the Wall Street Journal, which declared the consensus of the signing scholars on the measurement and significance of intelligence following the publication of the book The Bell Curve.

Books

References

1925 births
Living people
21st-century American psychologists
American psychology writers
American male non-fiction writers
Intelligence researchers
New York University alumni
20th-century American psychologists